The Federal Correctional Institution, Sheridan (FCI Sheridan) is a medium-security United States federal prison for male inmates in Oregon. Opened in 1989, it is operated by the Federal Bureau of Prisons, a division of the United States Department of Justice. The facility also includes a detention center housing male offenders and an adjacent minimum-security satellite prison camp also for male offenders. FCI Sheridan is located in northwestern Oregon in Sheridan.

History
Sheridan, Oregon, began campaigning to be the site of the first federal prison in Oregon in 1981. Then Senator Mark Hatfield and Congressman Les AuCoin worked to help get Sheridan selected as the site for the prison. Federal prison officials began looking at sites around Sheridan to build a proposed $50 million minimum and medium security prison in 1985. Plans called for the prison to be built on farmland south of the city. Some local residents opposed building the facility near Sheridan and created a group to fight the government. In August 1986, the  location south of Sheridan was approved by the Federal Bureau of Prisons. These early plans called for a 250-person minimum security unit, a 550-person minimum security unit, with a total cost of $48 million. The Delphian School's campus was also a candidate for the location of the prison.

State and county governments expanded Sheridan's urban growth boundary to include the prison site in 1986, which opponents then fought in court. These efforts, along with two ballot measures in November 1986, all failed, and groundbreaking for construction was held in March 1987. Local businesses and the city had sought the prison to provide jobs in the area. Sheridan expanded its water and wastewater treatment systems at a cost of $2.2 million as part of the project.

FCI Sheridan opened in May 1989 with George Killinger as the warden. Oregon's first federal prison cost $52 million to build. Construction began in 1987 with a design to hold 550 inmates at the prison portion and an additional 256 camp prisoners. Portland's Hoffman Construction Company built the prison for the federal government. The prison was officially dedicated on August 24, 1989. FCI Sheridan experienced a riot in September 1993 that destroyed one building when inmates set it on fire. Another lockdown occurred in September 2003 when 40 prisoners were involved in fights using homemade weapons. In December 1994, an additional 300 beds were added to the facility as a federal detention center for housing pre-trial inmates. The separate facility from the main prison cost $10 million to build.

The Oregon Legislature passed a law in 1999 that prevented inmates in federal prisons from voting in local elections. Since Oregon had never had a federal prison, only state prisoners had previously been barred from voting. In 2000, the U.S. Census Bureau mistakenly listed the prison population in one census tract instead of the correct census tract. Oregon Secretary of State Bill Bradbury used the incorrect data when re-drawing the state's legislative districts as is done after each census. This small error of about 2000 people was enough to throw off the districts beyond their margin of acceptance and the Oregon Supreme Court ruled the Secretary must re-draw the boundary lines to match the correct data. The city also counts the prison population as part of the city's official population.

Facility

FCI Sheridan houses approximately 1900 total inmates. This includes the main medium security detention facility and a smaller minimum security prison camp. The facility is designed in a style that resembles college campuses that are meant to foster rehabilitation. Buildings housing inmates have white exteriors with red-colored roofs. These concrete, two-story structures are modeled after dormitories. The factory buildings have roof lines that are meant to mimic the area's agricultural architecture. The prison industry (UNICOR) was a wood shop for the manufacturing of furniture until being closed down in 2006. Furniture included desks and office chairs. Inmates at the minimum security camp can study to work as landscape gardeners and personal fitness trainers after their release from prison. This is the only federal prison in Oregon.

Notable incidents
In April 2007, federal prosecutors indicted 13 people, including a correction officer, James Stephen Rolen,  at FCI Sheridan, on charges involving bribery and conspiracy to smuggle heroin, marijuana and drug paraphernalia into the prison. Mr. Rolen was subsequently convicted and in March 2008 was sentenced to 24 months in federal prison, followed by 2 years of supervised release.

In March 2012, Rafael Hall, a 24-year-old inmate, died at FCI Sheridan. Hall and 30 other alleged members of the Rolling 60s, a subset of the Crips street gang, were arrested during an anti-gang operation involving the Portland Police Bureau and the FBI in December 2011. Hall was awaiting trial on charges of cocaine distribution and had pleaded not guilty. The Yamhill County Medical Examiner subsequently ruled the death a suicide. The charges against Hall were dismissed due to his death.

In late May 2018, 124 asylum seekers were transferred to FDC Sheridan as a part of the Trump administration's "Zero Tolerance" immigration policy. Many had been forcibly separated from their families as a part of the Trump administration family separation policy. For nearly a month, the individuals detained were held in near isolation and were not allowed to contact their families or lawyers. Many of these individuals were forcibly separated from their families, including their children, as a part of the Trump administration family separation policy. As the result of an emergency lawsuit by the ACLU of Oregon, failure to provide access to legal counsel was deemed unconstitutional. As of November 2018, all immigration detainees have been released from FDC Sheridan, the majority of whom were released according to law to live with family, friends, or sponsors as they pursue their asylum claims in immigration court.

Notable inmates (current and former)

Current

Former

See also

List of U.S. federal prisons
Incarceration in the United States

References

External links
FCI Sheridan
Aerial photo of CFI Sheridan

Sheridan
Sheridan, Oregon
Prisons in Oregon
1989 establishments in Oregon
Buildings and structures in Yamhill County, Oregon